Oeceoclades flavescens is a terrestrial orchid species in the genus Oeceoclades that is endemic to northeastern Madagascar. It was first described by the French botanists Jean Marie Bosser and Philippe Morat in 2001. The type specimen was collected in 1954 from the wet undergrowth of a coastal forest near Maroantsetra; it is the only known collection of this species. The specific epithet flavescens refers to the pale yellow flowers.

Description
The inflorescence is a simple raceme with only 10 to 12 pale yellow flowers with purple streaks on the labellum. The four lobes of the labellum are rounded and the spur is forward-projecting.

Oeceoclades flavescens is similar to O. pulchra but it is very distinctive in the papery leaves and the morphology of the labellum.

References

flavescens
Orchids of Madagascar
Endemic flora of Madagascar
Plants described in 2001